Gângiova is a commune in Dolj County, Oltenia, Romania with a population of 2,963 people. It is composed of two villages, Comoșteni and Gângiova.

References

Communes in Dolj County
Localities in Oltenia